Grand Duchy is an American alternative/electronic/art rock band formed in 2008 by Black Francis and his wife Violet Clark.

Discography
Lovesick (2009)
 "Lovesick"
 "Vapors"
 "The Timbers"
Petits Fours (2009)
 "Come On Over To My House" – 2:45
 "Lovesick" – 3:52
 "Fort Wayne" – 4:37
 "Seeing Stars" – 3:29
 "Black Suit" – 4:30
 "The Long Song" – 5:16
 "Break the Angels" – 5:18
 "Ermesinde" – 4:04
 "Volcano!" – 3:36
 "Donnez-moi" - 3:34 (bonus track)
 "Ma Carrefour" - 5:15 (bonus track)
 "Beg" - 4:07 (bonus track)
Let the People Speak (2012)
 "The Lopsided World of L" – 0:23
 "See-Thru You" – 4:24
 "White Out" – 5:07
 "Where Is John Frum?" – 3:33
 "Geode" – 5:40
 "Shady" – 3:21
 "Annie Bliss" – 3:35
 "Dark Sparkles and the Beat" – 6:56
 "Two Lies and One Truth" – 2:50
 "Silver Boys" – 5:31
 "Illiterate Lovers" – 4:04
 "Face" – 6:37
 "Esther" – 3:53
 "ROTC" – 4:10
 "Let the People Speak" – 4:39

Other collaborations

In 2008, Grand Duchy covered the song "A Strange Day" by the British band The Cure in a tribute album entitled Just Like Heaven.

External links
 on Allmusic 
Grand Duchy on Myspace

[ Grand Duchy at Allmusic]

References

Black Francis
Alternative rock groups from Oregon
Musical groups established in 2008
Musical groups from Portland, Oregon
Rock music duos
2008 establishments in Oregon